Mordellistena azteca is a beetle in the genus Mordellistena of the family Mordellidae. It was described in 1891 by George Charles Champion.

References

azteca
Beetles described in 1891